The Dodge was a cyclecar manufactured in Detroit, Michigan, by the A.M. Dodge Company from 1914 to 1915. The cyclecar had a four-cylinder 25 hp engine that was water-cooled, and had a frictionless transmission.  The vehicle was designed by George Wahl of Wahl Motor Company.  The company was later sued by the Dodge brothers in 1915, who claimed that their name had been infringed.

References

Cyclecars
Defunct motor vehicle manufacturers of the United States
Motor vehicle manufacturers based in Michigan
Vehicle manufacturing companies established in 1914
Vehicle manufacturing companies disestablished in 1915
1914 establishments in Michigan
1915 disestablishments in Michigan
Defunct manufacturing companies based in Detroit